Including players from the Parramatta Eels and Parramatta Eels Women's that have represented while at the club and the years they  achieved their honours, if known. Representatives from the Wentworthville Magpies and Cabramatta Two-Blues are included as they are feeder clubs.

International

Australia
    Ian Johnston (1949)
    Harold Crocker (1954–55)
    Ron Boden (1960)
    Bill Rayner (1960)
    Ron Lynch (1961–62, 1966–67, 1970)
    Brian Hambly (1963–65)
    Ken Thornett (1963–64)
    Dick Thornett (1963–64, 1966, 1968)
    Barry Rushworth (1964)
    Bob O'Reilly (1970–74)
    Keith Campbell (1971)
    Ray Higgs (1975, 1977)
    Denis Fitzgerald (1975, 1977)
    John Quayle (1975)
    Jim Porter (1975)
    Michael Cronin (1977–82)
    John Peard (1977)
    John Kolc (1977)
    Graham Olling (1978)
    Ray Price (1978–84)
    Neville Glover (1978)
    Geoff Gerard (1978)
    Ron Hilditch (1978, 1981)
    Garry Dowling (1980)
    John Muggleton (1982)
    Brett Kenny (1982, 1984, 1986–87)
    Steve Ella (1982–83, 1985)
    Eric Grothe, Sr. (1982–84)
    Peter Sterling (1982–83, 1986–88)
    Peter Wynn (1985)
    Bob Lindner (1987–88)
    Jim Dymock (1996)
    John Simon (1997)
    Dean Pay (1998)
    Jason Smith (1998-00)
    Michael Vella (1999-01)
    Nathan Hindmarsh (2000, 2004–07, 2009)
    Jamie Lyon (2001, 2003)
    Timana Tahu (2005–06)
    Eric Grothe, Jr. (2005)
    Jarryd Hayne (2007, 2009–10, 2013–14)
    Semi Radradra (2016)
    Reagan Campbell-Gillard (2022)

New Zealand
    Mark Horo (1990)
    Jarrod McCracken (1998–99)
    Nathan Cayless (1998-01, 2003–08)
    David Kidwell (1999-00)
    David Vaealiki (2000–03)
    David Solomona (2001–02)
    Krisnan Inu (2007–08)
    Fuifui Moimoi (2007, 2009)
    Manu Ma'u (2016)
    Brad Takairangi (2017)
    Marata Niukore (2022)
    Dylan Brown (2022)
    Isaiah Papali'i (2022)

Rest Of The World
    Jarrod McCracken (1997)

Ireland
    Apirana Pewhairangi (2013)

Italy
    Dean Parata (2013)
    Nathan Brown (2017, 2022)
    Daniel Alvaro (2017)
    Nick Okladnikov (2018)
    Luca Moretti (2022)
    Jack Colovatti (2022)

Lebanon
    Mark Daoud (2014)
    Tim Mannah (2017)
    Mitch Moses (2017, 2022)
    Anthony Layoun (2017)
    Elie El-Zakhem (2022)
    Jabriel Kalache (2022)

Scotland
   Luke Bain (2022)

Papua New Guinea
    Kevin Prior (2007–08)
    Richard Kambo (2009)

Cook Islands
    Brad Takairangi (2009-2013)
    Marata Niukore (2017)
    Makahesi Makatoa (2022)

Fiji
    Kaleveti Naisoro (1995)
    Jarryd Hayne (2008, 2018)
    Lepani Waqa (2009)
    Donas Gock (2009-2011)
    Semi Radradra (2013–14)
    Fabian Goodall (2014–15)
    Salesi Faingaa (2017)
    Kane Evans (2018–19)
    Maika Sivo (2019, 2022)
    Waqa Blake (2022)

Samoa
    Ben Roberts (2013)
    Reni Maitua (2013)
    Kaysa Pritchard (2016–17)
    Junior Paulo (2016, 2019–2022)
    Suaia Matagi (2017)
    Frank Pritchard (2017)
    Oregon Kaufusi (2022)

Tonga
    Phil Howlett (1995)
    Feleti Mateo (2006–09)
    Etu Uaisele (2006–09)
    Richard Fa'aoso (2007, 2015)
    Tony Williams (2008)
    Taniela Lasalo (2008)
    Kim Uasi (2009)
    Fuifui Moimoi (2013)
    Peni Terepo (2013–18)
    Vai Toutai (2014, 2016)
    John Folau (2014)
    Manu Ma'u (2015–19)
    Siosaia Vave (2017)
    Michael Jennings (2017–19)
    Peni Terepo (2018–19)
    Will Penisini (2022)

United States
    Matthew Petersen (2004)
    Joseph Paulo (2010–13)
    Bureta Faraimo (2013)

Australia Women's
    Simaima Taufa (2022)
    Kennedy Cherrington (2022)

State Of Origin

New South Wales
    Geoff Gerard (1979–80)
    Michael Cronin (1980–83)
    Steve Edge (1980)
    Ray Price (1981–84)
    Ron Hilditch (1981)
    Eric Grothe, Sr. (1981–86)
    Peter Sterling (1981–88)
    John Muggleton (1982)
    Brett Kenny (1982–87)
    Steve Ella (1983–85)
    Geoff Bugden (1983)
    Neil Hunt (1983)
    Stan Jurd (1983)
    Peter Wynn (1984–85)
    Jim Dymock (1996–98)
    Dean Pay (1996–98)
    John Simon (1997)
    Michael Vella (1999-02)
    Nathan Hindmarsh (2001–10)
    Andrew Ryan (2001)
    Jamie Lyon (2002–03)
    Jason Moodie (2002)
    Brett Hodgson (2002)
    Timana Tahu (2005–10)
    Eric Grothe, Jr. (2006)
    Jarryd Hayne (2007–13)
    Tim Mannah (2010–11)
    Will Hopoate (2014–15)
    Michael Jennings (2016)
    Blake Ferguson (2019) 
    Clinton Gutherson (2020)
    Junior Paulo (2020–22)
    Nathan Brown (2020)
    Mitchell Moses (2021)
    Reagan Campbell-Gillard (2022)
    Ryan Matterson (2022)

Queensland
    Arthur Beetson (1980)
    Chris Phelan (1983–84)
    Bob Lindner (1987–88)
    Jason Smith (1996-00)
    Stuart Kelly (1997)
    Daniel Wagon (2001)

New South Wales Women
    Tiana Penitani (2022)
    Simaima Taufa (2022)

All Stars Game

NRL/World All Stars
    Jarryd Hayne (2010, 2013)
    Nathan Hindmarsh (2011–12)
    Beau Scott (2016)
       Semi Radradra (2016)
     Tepai Moeroa (2017)

Indigenous All Stars
    Carl Webb (2011)
    Chris Sandow (2012)
    Bevan French (2017, 19)
    Blake Ferguson (2019–21)
    J'maine Hopgood (2023)

Māori All Stars
   Brad Takairangi (2019–20)
   Wiremu Greig (2022)

Indigenous Women's
    Tommaya Kelly-Sines (2022)

Māori Women's
   Botille Vette-Welsh (2022)
   Jocephy Daniels (2022)
   Nita Maynard (2022)
   Kennedy Cherrington (2022-23)
   Brooke Anderson (2023)
   Gayle Broughton (2023)
   Zali Fay (2023)
   Ashleigh Quinlan (2023)

City Vs Country Origin

NSW City
    Eric Grothe, Sr. (1987)
    Dallas Weston (1993)
    Brett Hodgson (2001)
    Jason Cayless (2001)
    Brad Drew (2001)
    Jason Moodie (2002)
    Eric Grothe, Jr. (2005)
    Jarryd Hayne (2007–09, 2011, 2012)
    Feleti Mateo (2008)
    Tim Mannah (2010, 2011)
    Joel Reddy (2010)
    Kris Keating (2010)
    Shane Shackleton (2011)
    Mitchell Allgood (2012)
    Nathan Peats (2015-2016)
    Clinton Gutherson (2016-2017)
    David Gower (2017)

NSW Country
    Jason Moodie (2001)
    Jamie Lyon (2003)
    John Morris (2003)
    Nathan Hindmarsh (2008)
    Timana Tahu (2010)
    Luke Burt (2010)
    Michael Gordon (2016)
    Daniel Alvaro (2017)

Other honours

Prime Minister's XIII
    Nathan Hindmarsh (2005, 2008, 2011)
    Brett Finch (2005)
    Jarryd Hayne (2006, 2008)
    Ben Smith (2010)
    Tim Mannah (2011)
    Luke Burt (2011)
    Semi Radradra (2016)
    Corey Norman (2017)
    Nathan Brown (2019)
    Clinton Gutherson (2019)
    Reed Mahoney (2019)
    Mitchell Moses (2019)

All Golds
    Nathan Cayless (2008)
    Krisnan Inu (2008)

New Zealand Māori
    David Kidwell (2000)
    Weller Hauraki (2008)

Representative Captains

World Cup Captains
New Zealand
    Nathan Cayless (2008)

Italy
    Nathan Brown (2022)

Lebanon
    Mitch Moses (2022)

Samoa
    Junior Paulo (2022)

Test Captains
New Zealand
    Nathan Cayless (2008)

Representative Coaching Staff

International
Australia
    Vic Hey (Coach - 1950–51)
    Terry Fearnley (Coach - 1977)

Cook Islands
    David Fairleigh (Coach - 2009)

New Zealand
    Stephen Kearney (Coach - 2011–12)

City Vs Country Origin
NSW City
    Brian Smith (Coach - 2002)

NSW Country
    Michael Cronin (Coach - 1992)
    Brian Smith (Coach - 2001, 2003)

References

Parramatta Eels
L
National Rugby League lists
Sydney-sport-related lists